Vitaliy Popovich (born 22 October 1962) is a Ukrainian male former racewalking athlete who competed in the 50 kilometres race walk. He competed in the men's 50 kilometres walk at the 1988 Summer Olympics, representing the Soviet Union, and in the same event at the 1996 Summer Olympics, representing Ukraine. He was a three-time participant at the World Championships in Athletics, with a best of fourth at the 1991 event. He also competed at five straight editions of the IAAF World Race Walking Cup from 1989 to 1997. He set a personal best of 3:43:57 hours for the distance in 1989.

At national level, he won one Soviet title in 1991 and, after the dissolution of the Soviet Union, took four 50 km walk titles at the Ukrainian Athletics Championships. On the professional circuit, he was the 1996 winner at the Dudinská Päťdesiatka.

International competitions

National titles
Soviet Athletics Championships
50 km walk: 1991
Ukrainian Athletics Championships
50 km walk: 1993, 1994, 1995, 1997

References

External links

Living people
1962 births
Ukrainian male racewalkers
Soviet male racewalkers
Olympic male racewalkers
Olympic athletes of the Soviet Union
Olympic athletes of Ukraine
Athletes (track and field) at the 1988 Summer Olympics
Athletes (track and field) at the 1996 Summer Olympics
World Athletics Championships athletes for Ukraine
World Athletics Championships athletes for the Soviet Union
Soviet Athletics Championships winners
Competitors at the 1986 Goodwill Games